Sigapatella superstes is a species of medium-sized sea snail, a marine gastropod mollusc in the family Calyptraeidae.

Distribution
This species is endemic to New Zealand.

References
 Powell A. W. B., William Collins Publishers Ltd, Auckland 1979 
 Marshall B.A. 2003. A review of the Recent and Late Cenozoic Calyptraeidae of New Zealand (Mollusca: Gastropoda). The Veliger 46(2): 117-144

Calyptraeidae
Gastropods of New Zealand
Gastropods described in 1958